Fabio De Sousa (born December 30, 1997) is an American soccer player who plays for Morris Elite in the USL League Two.

Career

Youth and college 
De Sousa played two years of college soccer for Rutgers University–Newark in the NCAA Division III. In his freshman year, he made 24 appearances, and lead the team with 14 goals. During his sophomore season with the Raiders, he made 24 appearances, scoring 18 goals.

Senior 
During the summers between the college soccer seasons, De Sousa played in the Premier Development League. During the 2016 season, De Sousa was part of the Jersey Express roster, although he did not make an appearance with the side.

During the 2017 PDL season, De Sousa played with the New York Red Bulls' under-23 side. There, he made 13 appearances, scoring 3 goals and having 3 assists.

On March 9, 2018, De Sousa signed with Penn FC of the United Soccer League, forgoing his final two years of NCAA eligibility.

On May 23, 2018, De Sousa made his professional debut in the third round of the 2018 U.S. Open Cup. He played the entire 90 minutes in a 2-3 loss to the Richmond Kickers.

On October 24, 2020, De Sousa signed with Morris Elite in the USL League Two to play in the clubs inaugural season.

References

External links 
 
 
 Rutgers–Newark Profile

1997 births
Living people
Soccer players from New Jersey
Sportspeople from Long Branch, New Jersey
Sportspeople from Monmouth County, New Jersey
American soccer players
Association football midfielders
Association football forwards
Rutgers–Newark Scarlet Raiders men's soccer players
Jersey Express players
New York Red Bulls U-23 players
Penn FC players
USL League Two players
USL Championship players
FC Motown players
National Premier Soccer League players
Morris Elite SC players